We Are Little Zombies (aka Wī Ā Ritoru Zonbīzu) is a 2019 Japanese coming-of-age comedy-drama film written, directed and composed by Makoto Nagahisa in his feature directorial debut. The film was shown at both the Sundance and Berlin International Film Festivals in the United States and Germany respectively.

Plot 

Four 13-year old children, the lead character Hikaru (Keita Ninomiya), Takemura (Mondo Okumura), Ishi (Satoshi Mizuno) and Ikuko (Sena Nakajima), meet outside a crematorium. Coming from challenging backgrounds, and often having unfortunate relationships with their family, they all dislike their recently deceased parents, all killed in unfortunate circumstances (automobile accident, double suicide, a wok-related fire and murder by the hands of a pedophilic piano teacher). They are all being cremated.

Not trusting adults, they bond over their shared attribute of not sharing emotion. At the same age, they decided to run away and form their own pop music band, which they call "The Little Zombies". People like their addictive music, and they go about meeting various people that will shape their future”. The children move through the story, dealing with their grief.

Cast 

 Keita Ninomiya as Hikari
 Satoshi Mizuno as Ishi
 Rinko Kikuchi as Ikuko Ibu
 Masatoshi Nagase as Haruhiko Ibu
 Yûki Kudô as Rie Ôta
 Kuranosuke Sasaki as Gen Takami

Awards and festival selections 
The film was shown in the following festivals:
 Tokyo International Film Festival
 Sundance Film Festival
 Berlin International Film Festival 
 New Zealand International Film Festival

Reception
 The website's critics' consensus reads, "We Are Little Zombies mixes the playful and the profane with a stylish and visually inventive look at death, abandonment, and the grieving process."

References

External links 

2019 comedy-drama films
Japanese drama films
2010s Japanese films
Japanese comedy-drama films
Japanese coming-of-age films
Films about orphans
Films set in Tokyo